The 1997–98 Umaglesi Liga was the ninth season of top-tier football in Georgia. It began on 8 July 1997 and ended on 22 May 1998. Dinamo Tbilisi were the defending champions.

Locations

League standings

Results

Top goalscorers

See also

1997–98 Georgian Cup

References

Georgia - List of final tables (RSSSF)

Erovnuli Liga seasons
1
Georgia